The 2012 Evansville Rage season was the first season for the Continental Indoor Football League (CIFL) franchise.

On November 16, 2011 the team announced its intentions to compete as full members of the CIFL for the 2013 season. The Rage had also already named their head coach on the same day, naming Mike Goodpaster to the position. Goodpaster was most recently the Defensive Coordinator of the Northern Kentucky River Monsters of the Ultimate Indoor Football League. On December 9, 2011 it was announced that the Rage were going become the final expansion team for the 2012 Continental Indoor Football League season. On March 6, 2012, owner and general manager, David Reed, resigned from the duties due to an illness in his family that requires his full attention. The same day, the Rage announced Eddie Cronin as the team's General Manager. Cronin had been a part of the organization from the start as the defensive coordinator. He continued to keep his position as defensive coordinator.

Players

Signings

FInal roster

Schedule

Preseason

Regular season

Standings

Regular season results

Week 2: vs Indianapolis Enforcers

With the victory, the Rage collected their first ever franchise victory. The Rage were led by quarterback Nate Samas who put the first points on the board with a four-yard keeper under two minutes into the game.  Samas also added five touchdowns through the air. Rage running back Joe Casey played a versatile role in the victory as well.  Casey racked up two rushing touchdowns and one receiving touchdown. Wide receiver Dusten Dubose compiled three receiving touchdowns from quarterback Nate Samas and receiver Terrence Wright  added one receiving touchdown. During the game, the Enforcers set a franchise record for points scored in a game, with 35. Their previous high had been 19.

With the win, the Rage improved to 1-0.

Week 3: vs Port Huron Patriots

With the win, the Rage improved to 2-0.

Week 4: vs Saginaw Sting

With the loss, the Rage fell to 2-1.

Coaching staff

References

2012 Continental Indoor Football League season
Owensboro Rage
Evansville Rage